Wan Runnan  (born 29 October 1946 in Yixing, Jiangsu) is a Software engineer, Entrepreneur and a Chinese human rights activist who is known for his involvement in the Chinese democracy movement.

Life 
Wan was in college studying engineering when he had his first taste of repression. With the fanaticism of the Cultural Revolution sweeping the country, Wan was forced to interrupt his studies by the authorities and sent, without reason, to labor as a railway worker in the countryside. He eventually graduated (1970) from Tsinghua University and went on to a position with the Chinese Academy of Sciences.

In 1984 he started Stone Emerging Industries Company, which produces computer software and English- Chinese word processors. 
The Chinese typewriter was ultimately eclipsed and made redundant with the introduction of computerised word processing, pioneered by engineer and dissident Wan Runnan and his partners when they formed Stone Emerging Industries Company in 1984 in Zhongguancun, China's "Silicon Valley".  Stone developed software based on Alps Electric custom made 8088 based hardware with a Brother Industries dot matrix printer, distributed by Mitsui, to print Chinese characters and released the system as the MS-2400.

When the pro-democracy protests began in the spring of 1989, Wan provided material support for the demonstrators in Tiananmen Square and helped organize negotiations between the students and government. He became convinced that the Communists would crack down if the square wasn’t evacuated, but his warnings to the students went unheeded and the massacre soon followed. Wan decided to flee after the June 4 crack down and is now wanted by the Chinese authorities.

A month after the massacre Wan Runnan, along with prominent exiles such as Liu Binyan, Wuer Kaixi and Yan Jiaqi, met in Paris to call for the creation of the Federation for a Democratic China (FDC). He was the President of the FDC and lived in France during the FDC's initial stages and later moved to the United States. Wan Runnan currently lives in Paris.

Runnan is one of three subjects in the feature documentary The Exiles (2022) which won the Grand Jury Prize for Best Documentary at the Sundance Film Festival.

References

External links 

 獨立中文筆會萬潤南專頁(Chinese language)

1946 births
Chinese dissidents
Chinese democracy activists
Writers from Beijing
Chinese human rights activists
Living people